The 1957 Sugar Bowl to the featured the second-ranked Tennessee Volunteers and the 11th-ranked Baylor Bears. Behind a strong defense, the Baylor Bears upset undefeated Tennessee.

After a scoreless first quarter of play, Baylor scored on a 12-yard scoring pass from quarterback Bobby Jones to Jerry Marcontell to take a 6–0 lead. The score was set up by Del Shofner's 54-yard run. In the third stanza, quarterback Johnny Majors scored on a 1-yard touchdown run to put Tennessee on top at 7–6. In the fourth quarter, Buddy Humphrey's one-yard touchdown run gave Baylor a 13–6 advantage. Baylor's defense provided the difference as they didn't allow any more points.

Shofner was named Sugar Bowl MVP.

References

Sugar Bowl
Sugar Bowl
Baylor Bears football bowl games
Tennessee Volunteers football bowl games
Sugar Bowl
Sugar Bowl